Pattapur is a village in the Ganjam district of Odisha state, India. Belongs Sanakhemundi Block.

Bhubaneswar is the state capital for Pattapur village. It is located around 159.4 km away from Pattapur. 

The nearest railway station to Pattapur is Brahmapur which is located around 27.3 km distance.

Pattapur's nearest town/city/important place is Digapahandi located at the distance of 8.7 km. Surrounding town/city/TP/CT from Pattapur are as follows.

Pattapur has Govt. Hospital, Block, Govt. High School, Govt. College.

Villages in Ganjam district